Alatsee is a meromictic lake in Ostallgäu, Bavaria, Germany. At an elevation of 868.0 m, its surface area is 12.00 ha. This lake supposedly holds "Hitler's gold". Many divers have died or disappeared mysteriously in this lake due to the  toxicity of the organisms living in this lake. These organisms create the "blood cloud "  that occurs quite abundantly throughout the year.

Lakes of Bavaria